Fritillaria macedonica is a European species of flowering plant in the lily family Liliaceae, native to  Albania, North Macedonia, Greece and Serbia.

References

External links
Universal Postal Union, Flora of Macedonia - Endemic Species - Fritillaria macedonica Bornm photo of Macedonian postage stamp featuring color depiction of Fritillaria macedonica
Balkan Photos, Fritillaria macedonica, Mavrovo Macedonia
Smugmug, North American Rock Garden Society Photographic competition 2012, photo by Kees Jan van Zwienen 

macedonica
Flora of Southeastern Europe
Plants described in 1923
Taxa named by Joseph Friedrich Nicolaus Bornmüller